Vittorio Casaretti (born 24 October 1922) is an Italian retired professional football player.

External links
Profile at Enciclopediadelcalcio.it

1922 births
Possibly living people
Italian footballers
Serie A players
Inter Milan players

Association football midfielders
S.G. Gallaratese A.S.D. players